Sumrall is a town in Lamar County, Mississippi. It is part of the Hattiesburg, Mississippi Metropolitan Statistical Area. The population was 1,421 at the 2010 census.

History
Sumrall was one of many new towns incorporated along the Mississippi Central Railroad during the first decade of the 20th century. Prior to the arrival of the railroad, founder Daniel Sumrall operated a grist mill along Mill Creek. In 1890, the federal government established a post office in the community and named it Sumrall. The J. J. Newman Company, headed by Fenwick Peck, chose the site as the location for a large sawmill. Situated in the heart of South Mississippi's pine belt, the location was ideal for just such a large mill. Evidence of the quality of timber in the area is supported by a prize-winning short leaf pine displayed at the 1904 World's Fair in St. Louis. The tree was 160 feet tall, measured 20 feet in circumference and was 6 feet eight inches in diameter. With the arrival of the railroad, the town grew quickly and petitioned for incorporation as a town; this wish was granted by the Mississippi Legislature on October 6, 1902. Some early residents wanted to change the name of the town because, although Daniel Sumrall was a native of Perry County in Mississippi, he had served in the Civil War as a Union soldier. The federal government had the final choice in the matter and, as they refused to change the name of the post office, any change in the name of the city would have been meaningless.

For nearly 30 years the Newman Lumber Company was the main industry of the city. As the timber industry was a "cut out and get out" operation at this time, when the mill depleted the profitable timber supply it ceased operation in 1931. Combined with the Great Depression, the shutdown of the mill had a marked impact on the town and left it with no large employer for nearly 20 years.  In 1949, the Movie Star Company opened a woman's lingerie plant in nearby Purvis, and soon opened a similar plant in Sumrall which provided stable employment for many local women until the 1990s. The population of the city remained flat or declined from 1940-2000. As the metropolitan area of Hattiesburg has expanded westward, Sumrall is now once again experiencing economic growth. The Longleaf Trace, a recreational trail which follows the route of the former Mississippi Central Railroad, runs through the center of town. The Longleaf Trace extends from Hattiesburg, MS to Prentiss Mississippi and is popular with bikers, hikers, and horseback riders.

In 2017 Cooperative Energy opened a solar farm (photovoltaic power station) near Sumrall.

Geography

Climate
The climate in this area is characterized by relatively high temperatures and evenly distributed precipitation throughout the year.  According to the Köppen Climate Classification system, Sumrall has a humid subtropical climate, abbreviated "Cfa" on climate maps.

Demographics

2020 census

As of the 2020 United States census, there were 1,765 people, 618 households, and 454 families residing in the town.

2000 census
At the 2000 census, there were 1,005 people, 406 households and 265 families residing in the town. The population density was 468.6 per square mile (181.3/km). There were 436 housing units at an average density of 203.3 per square mile (78.7/km). The racial makeup of the town was 76.62% White, 22.29% African American, 10.3% Native American, 0.10% from other races, and 0.90% from two or more races. Hispanic or Latino of any race were 0.70% of the population.

There were 406 households, of which 34.5% had children under the age of 18 living with them, 48.0% were married couples living together, 15.8% had a female householder with no husband present, and 34.5% were non-families. 32.3% of all households were made up of individuals, and 17.2% had someone living alone who was 65 years of age or older. The average household size was 2.43 and the average family size was 3.09.

27.2% of the population was under the age of 18, 9.2% from 18 to 24, 27.3% from 25 to 44, 21.8% from 45 to 64, and 14.6% who were 65 years of age or older. The median age was 36 years. For every 100 females, there were 87.9 males. For every 100 females age 18 and over, there were 79.0 males.

The median household income was $25,800 and the median family income was $37,784. Males had a median income of $29,500 versus $16,786 for females. The per capita income for the town was $14,715. About 13.3% of families and 18.0% of the population were below the poverty line, including 20.7% of those under age 18 and 25.4% of those age 65 or over.

Sports
Sumrall High School won 3A State Championships in baseball in 2008, 2009, 2010, and 2015. Sumrall High School won 4A State Championship in baseball in 2022. The 2009 team was undefeated, while the 2010 and the 2022 team lost a single game. They currently hold the state record in Mississippi for the consecutive number of high school baseball games won, with a streak of 67 games won between 2008 and 2010.

Education
The Town of Sumrall is served by the Lamar County School District.
Schools in Sumrall are the Sumrall High School (Home of the Bobcats)
or the Elementary School of Sumrall

Notable people
 Dawn H. Beam, associate justice of the Supreme Court of Mississippi
 Jake Brown, former Major League Baseball player
 Leonard Caston, blues musician
 Archie Cooley, college football coach
 Joey Fillingane, member of the Mississippi State Senate
 Cary Hudson, lead singer, guitarist and main songwriter of the alternative country/Southern rock band Blue Mountain
 Billy Lott, former running back in the National Football League and American Football League
 Sixty Rayburn, former member of the Louisiana House of Representatives and Louisiana State Senate
 Jordan Thomas, NFL tight end

References

Towns in Lamar County, Mississippi
Towns in Mississippi
Hattiesburg metropolitan area